Jeevan Nagle (born 10 October 1989) is an Indian professional footballer who plays as a midfielder for Salgaocar F.C. in the I-League. He now coaches young talents at Stepover FA after retiring due to a life threatening injury to his prostate.

Career
After spending time with Deccan XI, Nagle signed his first professional contract with Salgaocar F.C. of the I-League before the 2013–14 season. He then made his debut in the I-League for Salgaocar on 6 October 2013 against Mohammedan S.C. In which he came on as a 92nd-minute substitute as Salgaocar won the match 3–0.

Career statistics

References

1989 births
Living people
Indian footballers
Salgaocar FC players
Association football midfielders
I-League players